Kristen McDonald Rivet is an American politician who is a member of the Michigan Senate for the 35th district. Elected in November 2022, she will assume office on January 1, 2023.

Early life and education 
McDonald Rivet was raised in Portland, Michigan, with her fraternal twin sister Karen McDonald. She earned a Bachelor of Arts degree in history from Michigan State University and a Master of Arts in education and public administration from the University of Michigan–Flint.

Career 
Prior to entering politics, McDonald Rivet served as chief of staff for State Superintendent Michael P. Flanagan and was vice president of the Skillman Foundation. McDonald Rivet later served as a member of the Bay City Commission, representing the city's 2nd ward. She was elected to the Michigan Senate in November 2022, defeating Republican state Representative  Annette Glenn.

Personal life 
McDonald Rivet and her husband, Joseph Rivet, have six children.

References 

Living people
Democratic Party Michigan state senators
Women state legislators in Michigan
People from Portland, Michigan
People from Ionia County, Michigan
Michigan State University alumni
University of Michigan–Flint alumni
People from Bay City, Michigan
21st-century American politicians
21st-century American women politicians
Year of birth missing (living people)